Dungeon Survival Guide is a supplement to the 3.5 edition of the Dungeons & Dragons role-playing game.

Contents
Dungeon Survival Guide is an accessory that explores the features of dungeons in Dungeons & Dragons, and revisits 20 famous dungeons from throughout the game's history.

Publication history
Dungeon Survival Guide was written by Bill Slavicsek and Christopher Perkins, and published in October 2007.

Reception
Shannon Appelcline notes that the Dungeon Survival Guide was "poorly-received", as it was "pure fluff [...] with no stats at all", noting that Wizards of the Coast was preparing D&D 4th edition and avoided producing books that would soon be outdated.

References

Dungeons & Dragons sourcebooks
Role-playing game supplements introduced in 2007